Fudbalski klub Sarajevo (English: Football Club Sarajevo) is a professional football club based in Sarajevo, Bosnia and Herzegovina.

The first ever involvement of the team in European competitions was in the 1960 Mitropa Cup.

Summary

Statistics

Results
 QR = Qualifying Round
 PO = Play-off Round
 R1 = First Round / R2 = Second Round / R3 = Third Round / R16 = Round of 16
 QF = Quarter Finals
 SF = Semi-finals

European Cup / UEFA Champions League

UEFA Cup / UEFA Europa League

UEFA Europa Conference League

Non-UEFA Organised Competitions

Intertoto Cup

Mitropa Cup

Balkans Cup

1 Galatasaray retired from the competition having played two games against Olympiakos; thus, its record was cancelled.

Club ranking

UEFA coefficient

2021–22 season 

As of 26 August 2021. 
Source

See also

Bosnian football clubs in European competitions
Yugoslav First League – Best finish in Europe by club

References

External links
Official Website 
FK Sarajevo at Facebook
FK Sarajevo at Twitter
FK Sarajevo at UEFA
FKSinfo 

FK Sarajevo
Sarajevo
Bosnian football clubs in international competitions